Wirral was a county constituency which returned one Member of Parliament (MP)  to the House of Commons of the Parliament of the United Kingdom from 1885 to 1983, elected by the first past the post voting system.

The constituency was located on the Wirral Peninsula, historically part of Cheshire in North West England.

History 
Wirral was created by the Redistribution of Seats Act 1885 for the 1885 general election. As the population of the Wirral peninsula grew, its boundaries were redrawn to allow for additional constituencies to be created. From 1974, its territory was split between the newly created Metropolitan Borough of Wirral, part of the metropolitan county of Merseyside, and the borough of Ellesmere Port and Neston which remained part of Cheshire.

It was abolished for the 1983 general election, and was succeeded by the constituencies of Ellesmere Port and Neston, Wirral South and Wirral West.

Boundaries 
1885–1918: The Borough of Birkenhead, and the Hundred of Wirral.

Created as one of eight single-member divisions of Cheshire, replacing the three 2-member divisions. It covered the whole of the historical hundred of Wirral, which included Birkenhead, Wallasey, Neston, Bebington, Ellesmere Port and extended south to the City of Chester. Birkenhead was a separate parliamentary borough, but non-resident freeholders were entitled to vote in the constituency.

1918–1950: The Urban Districts of Bromborough, Ellesmere Port and Whitby, Higher Bebington, Hoylake and West Kirby, Lower Bebington, and Neston and Parkgate, and the Rural District of Wirral.

Wallasey was created as a new parliamentary borough. Southern-most parts transferred to the enlarged City of Chester constituency.

1950–1974: The Urban Districts of Ellesmere Port, Hoylake, Neston, and Wirral.

Parts of the constituency absorbed by the County Boroughs of Birkenhead and Wallasey transferred to the respective constituencies.  Area comprising the Municipal Borough of Bebington formed the basis of the new constituency of that name.  Other minor changes resulting from reorganisation of local authorities.

The Urban District of Ellesmere Port became a Municipal Borough in 1955.

1974–1983: The Urban Districts of Hoylake, Neston, and Wirral, and the County Borough of Birkenhead wards of Prenton and Upton.

Ellesmere Port transferred to the new constituency of Bebington and Ellesmere Port. Prenton transferred from Bebington, which was now abolished, and Upton transferred from Birkenhead.

From 1 April 1974 until it was abolished for the 1983 general election, Neston remained in Cheshire whilst the rest of the constituency comprised parts of the Metropolitan Borough of Wirral in Merseyside, but its boundaries were unchanged.

On abolition, Hoylake was included in Wirral West, Heswall (the main town in the Urban District of Wirral) in Wirral South and Neston in Ellesmere Port and Neston.

Members of Parliament

Elections results

Elections in the 1880s

Elections in the 1890s

Elections in the 1900s

Elections in the 1910s 

General Election 1914–15:

Another General Election was required to take place before the end of 1915. The political parties had been making preparations for an election to take place and by July 1914, the following candidates had been selected; 
Unionist: Gershom Stewart
Liberal: Arthur Jacob Ashton

Elections in the 1920s

Elections in the 1930s

Elections in the 1940s 
General Election 1939–40:

Another General Election was required to take place before the end of 1940. The political parties had been making preparations for an election to take place from 1939 and by the end of this year, the following candidates had been selected; 
Conservative: Alan Graham
Liberal: Thomas Mercer Banks
Labour: Lois Bulley

Elections in the 1950s

Elections in the 1960s

Elections in the 1970s

See also

 History of parliamentary constituencies and boundaries in Cheshire

References

Parliamentary constituencies in North West England (historic)
Politics of the Metropolitan Borough of Wirral
Constituencies of the Parliament of the United Kingdom established in 1885
Constituencies of the Parliament of the United Kingdom disestablished in 1983